Hiroshi Ohguri ( Ōguri Hiroshi, July 9, 1918 - April 18, 1982) was a Japanese composer.

Biography
Born in the Senba district of Osaka into a merchant family, his father was an amateur Gidayu player, and he grew up surrounded by traditional Japanese music.  He was introduced to European classical music in 1931, upon his entry into high school, where he joined the wind band and learned to play the French horn.  After a spell in his family's store, in 1941 he went to Tokyo, where he joined the Tokyo Symphony Orchestra as a hornist.  In 1946 he became principal horn of the Japan Symphony Orchestra; in 1949 he resigned and returned to Osaka, where in 1950 he joined the Osaka Philharmonic Orchestra.  Here he remained until 1966.  Ohguri also taught music in Kyoto Women's University and Osaka College of Music.  He died in 1982.

Works

Opera
 Akai Jinbaori (The Scarlet Cloak), text by Junji Kinoshita (1955)
 Jigokuhen (Hell Screen), text by Ryūnosuke Akutagawa (1968)
 Poseidon Kamensai, text by Kunio Tsuji (1974)

Orchestral
 Fantasy on Osaka Folk Tunes (1955)
 Violin Concerto (1963)
 Rhapsody on Osaka Nursery Rhymes (1979)

Wind Orchestra
 Rhapsody (1966)
 Shinwa (A Myth) - after the Tale of Ama-no-Iwayado (1973)
 Burlesque for band (1976) 
 Kamen Gensō (Mask Fantasy) (1981)

Mandolin Orchestra
 Sinfonietta No.1 (1967)
 Sinfonietta No.2 "Romantic" (1974)
 Sinfonietta No.3 "Gholghola's Hill" (1975)
 Sinfonietta No.4 "Labyrinthos" (1975)
 Sinfonietta No.5 (1977)
 Sinfonietta No.6 "Dogū" (1978)
 Sinfonietta No.7 "Contrast" (1981)
 Suite "Kugutsushi (Puppet master)" (1972)
 Symphonic three movements "Fujutsushi (Shaman)" (1976)
 Suite "Onmyōji (Master of onmyōdō)" (1977)
 Kodaibukyoku (Ancient Dances) (1978)
 Meditation (1978)
 Buyōshi (Dance poem) (1979)
 Burlesque'' for mandolin orchestra (1980)

References
Biography at Naxos.com

1918 births
1982 deaths
20th-century classical composers
20th-century Japanese composers
20th-century Japanese male musicians
Japanese classical composers
Japanese horn players
Japanese male classical composers
Japanese opera composers
Male opera composers
Musicians from Osaka
Academic staff of Osaka College of Music